The Ben Ezra Synagogue, sometimes referred to as the El-Geniza Synagogue or the Synagogue of the Levantines (al-Shamiyin), is situated in the Fustat part of Old Cairo, Egypt. According to local folklore, it is located on the site where baby Moses was found.

This was the synagogue whose geniza or store room was found in the 19th century to contain a treasure of forgotten, stored-away Hebrew, Aramaic and Judeo-Arabic secular and sacred manuscripts. The collection, known as the Cairo Geniza, was brought to the University of Cambridge in Cambridge, England at the instigation of Solomon Schechter. It is now divided between several academic libraries, with the majority being kept at the Cambridge University Library.

History

Outline
Ben Ezra as an institution is ancient, and has occupied at least three buildings in its history. There have been many major and minor renovations. The current building dates to the 1890s.

Establishment
The founding date of the Ben Ezra Synagogue is not known, although there is good evidence from documents found in the geniza that it predates 882 CE and is probably pre-Islamic. In 882, the patriarch of the Coptic Orthodox Church of Alexandria sold a church and its grounds to a group of Jews, and some 19th-century scholars have assumed that this was the origin of Ben Ezra. However, the buyers were followers of the Talmudic Academies in Babylonia, and Ben Ezra was a congregation that observed the teachings of the rival Talmudic Academies in Syria Palaestina. Modern scholars agree that the 882 land sale was to a rival synagogue.

Little is known about the original building. In about 1012, Fatimid caliph Al-Hakim bi-Amr Allah ordered the destruction of all Jewish and Christian places of worship. The original Ben Ezra Synagogue was torn down, "its bricks and timber sold for scrap".

Second building (11th century – 1168)
The next caliph, al-Zahir li-i'zaz Din Allah, allowed the reconstruction of Christian and Jewish institutions, and the synagogue was rebuilt in the 1025–1040 period. Study of a carved wood Torah ark door reliably attributed to the synagogue sheds light on the history of the synagogue's renovations. The door is jointly owned by the Walters Art Museum in Baltimore, and the Yeshiva University Museum in New York. Radiocarbon dating verifies that the wood goes back to the 11th century CE.

Geniza
Historically, synagogues have included a genizah, or repository for abandoned or outdated documents containing the name of God, since Jewish teaching is that such papers had to be stored with reverence, and then eventually buried in a cemetery. The 11th-century building incorporated an unusually large geniza, "two stories high, more silo than attic – with a rooftop opening accessible from above." Some documents added to it had been stored in the previous building, and the oldest dated document is about 150 years older than the geniza itself. Documents continued to accumulate there for about 850 years. The diverse collection of documents included rabbinical texts, historical accounts, and religious and secular poems, dating from the sixth century through the nineteenth century CE.

1168 fire
In 1168, a deliberately set fire destroyed much of the city of Fustat, where the synagogue was then located. Fustat is now a part of Cairo. The Islamic vizier Shawar ordered the city burned to prevent it from falling into the hands of an invading Christian Crusader army. Saladin, who became Sultan of Egypt shortly thereafter, ordered the rebuilding of Fustat.

Third building

Maimonides in Fustat (1168-1204)
Also in 1168, the Jewish philosopher, physician and astronomer Maimonides settled in Fustat, within a short walk of Ben Ezra Synagogue. He lived there until his death in 1204. Maimonides became Nagid, or leader of the Egyptian Jewish community in 1171, and worshipped at Ben Ezra. Many of the geniza documents, including some in his own handwriting, discuss his life and work, and are the most important primary biographical sources for him.

Torah ark
The style of the carving on the Torah ark door is incompatible with that of the Fatimid Caliphate (909–1171 CE), and is more representative of the Mamluk Sultanate (1250–1571 CE), specifically the 15th century. A medallion that decorates the door is designed with a motif common to bookbinding of that period. It is known that a 15th-century fire in the synagogue damaged the bimah, or pulpit. One plausible theory is that wood from the damaged bimah was repurposed to make a new door for the Torah ark. The synagogue was repaired and renovated in 1488.

The door also has traces of paint that conservators have identified as being no older than 19th century. It is known that the synagogue was renovated in the 1880s, completely rebuilt in the early 1890s, and then remodeled in the early 20th century.

Discovery of the geniza and fourth building
Jacob Saphir was a Jew of Romanian birth whose family settled in Ottoman Palestine when he was a boy. He became a rabbi, and in 1859, took a world tour to raise money for the reconstruction of the Hurva Synagogue in Jerusalem, which had been destroyed by the Muslim authorities in 1721. Saphir was the first to recognize the historic significance of the Ben Ezra geniza, which he described in an 1874 book. Jewish book collector Elkan Nathan Adler was the first European to enter the geniza in 1888, and he purchased about 25,000 documents. While the synagogue was being rebuilt from 1889 to 1892, the documents lay in an enormous pile out in the open. Egyptologist Count Riamo d'Hulst examined some of the documents in those years. In December 1896, Cambridge University instructor Solomon Schechter, who later became a prominent American rabbi, began the first in-depth academic investigation of the documents from the geniza, and arranged to have the remaining documents removed from Cairo to various university libraries.

Dwindling congregation
Egypt's Jewish community is at the end of a dramatic decline, from about 80,000 people in the 1920s to less than a dozen of Egyptian ancestry now residing in Cairo. Accordingly, the Ben Ezra Synagogue functions now as a tourist attraction and museum, rather than as a functioning congregation.

See also
Cairo Geniza
History of the Jews in Egypt

References

External links

Cambridge University Library: The Taylor-Schechter Genizah Research Unit – photo of the Ben Ezra Synagogue after restoration
The Ben Ezra Synagogue, Cairo, The Museum of the Jewish People at Beit Hatfutsot

Synagogues completed in 1892
Old Cairo
Orthodox Judaism in Egypt
Orthodox synagogues
Religious organizations established in 1892
Sephardi Jewish culture in Egypt
Sephardi synagogues
Synagogues in Cairo
19th-century religious buildings and structures in Egypt